Soltera may refer to:

 Soltera (film), a 1999 Filipino film
 "Soltera" (song), a 2019 song by Puerto Rican singer Lunay
 "Soltera", a song by Maluma featuring Madonna from Maluma's 2019 album 11:11

See also 

 Subaru Solterra, an electric sport utility vehicle